London 2 South West is an English level 7 Rugby Union League.  When this division began in 1987 it was known as London 3 South West, changing to its current name ahead of the 2009–10 season.  The division is made up of teams predominantly from south-west London, Surrey, and Hampshire. The 12 teams play home and away matches from September through to April.  Each year all clubs in the division are also invited to take part in the RFU Intermediate Cup - a level 7 national competition.

Promoted teams move up to London 1 South with league champions going up automatically and the runners up playing a playoff against the runners up from London 2 South East while demoted teams usually drop down to London 3 South West.

Teams for 2021–22

The teams competing in 2021-22 achieved their places in the league based on performances in 2019-20, the 'previous season' column in the table below refers to that season not 2020-21.

Old Tonbridgians who finished 10th in 2019-20 were unable to fulfil their fixtures in and withdrew from the league in November 2021.  Later the same month London Exiles, who finished 9th in 2019-20, also withdrew from the league having played only one match.

Season 2020–21

On 30 October the RFU announced  that a decision had been taken to cancel Adult Competitive Leagues (National League 1 and below) for the 2020/21 season meaning London 2 South West was not contested.

Teams for 2019–20

Teams for 2018–19

Teams for 2017–18

Teams for 2016-17
Andover
Camberley (promoted from London 3 South West)
Effingham & Leatherhead	
KCS Old Boys 
London Cornish 
London Exiles 
Old Reigatian
Old Tonbridgians (promoted from London 3 South West)
Portsmouth
Twickenham (relegated from London 1 South)
Warlingham
Winchester

Teams for 2015-16
Andover (promoted from London 3 South West)
Basingstoke (relegated from London 1 South)
Cobham (relegated from London 1 South)
Effingham & Leatherhead	
KCS Old Boys 
London Cornish
London Exiles (promoted from London 3 South West)
Old Reigatian
Portsmouth
Warlingham
Weybridge Vandals
Winchester

Teams for 2014-15
Effingham & Leatherhead	
Farnham (promoted from London 3 South West)
KCS Old Boys (promoted from London 3 South West)
London Cornish
Old Alleynian
Old Reigatian
Portsmouth
Tadley
Tottonians
Warlingham
Weybridge Vandals
Winchester

Teams for 2013-14
Effingham & Leatherhead	
Gosport & Fareham
Guildford
London Cornish
Old Alleynian
Old Reigatian
Portsmouth
Teddington
Tottonians	
Trojans (relegated from London 1 South)	
Weybridge Vandals
Winchester (promoted from London 3 South West)

Teams for 2012-13
1	Chobham 	87

2	Sutton & Epsom	85

3	Guildford	80

4	Tottonians	71

5	Effingham & Leatherhead	59

6	Old Reigatian	50

7	Portsmouth	50

8	London Cornish	38

9	Teddington	37

10	Old Alleynian	35

11	KCS Old Boys	35

12	Camberley	15

Teams for 2011-12

1	Gosport & Fareham	                97

2	Wimbledon	                        88

3	Guildford	                                67

4	London Cornish	                59

5	Tottonians	                        55

6	Old Reigatian	                        54

7	Camberley	                        48

8	Effingham & Leatherhead	45

9	Chobham	                                43

10	Teddington	                        39

11	Twickenham	                        38

12	Bognor	                                15

Teams for 2010-11

 Bognor
 Effingham and Leatherhead
 Guernsey
 Guildford
 Gosport & Fareham
 KCS Old Boys
 London Cornish
 Old Reigatians
 Tottonians
 Trojans
 Twickenham
 Weybridge Vandals

Teams for 2009-10

 Bognor
 Effingham and Leatherhead
 Guernsey
 Guildford
 London Cornish
 London Irish Amateur
 London South Africa
 Tottonians
 Trojans
 Twickenham
 Weybridge Vandals
 Winchester

Original teams

When league rugby began in 1987 this division (known as London 3 South West) contained the following teams:

Alton
Eastleigh
Guy's Hospital
Jersey
Old Emanuel
Old Whitgiftian
Old Walcountians
Purley
Trojans
Warlingham
Winchester

London 2 South West Honours

London 3 South West (1987–1993)

Originally known as London 3 South West, this division was a tier 7 league with promotion up to London 2 South and relegation down to either Hampshire 1 or Surrey 1.

London 3 South West (1993–1996)

At the end of the 1992–93 season, the top six teams from London 1 and the top six from South West 1 were combined to create National 5 South.  This meant that London 3 South West dropped from a tier 7 league to a tier 8 league for the years that National 5 South was active.  Promotion continued to London 2 South, and relegation to either Hampshire 1 or Surrey 1.

London 3 South West (1996–2000)

The cancellation of National 5 South at the end of the 1995–96 season meant that London 3 South West reverted to being a tier 7 league.  Promotion continued to London 2 South and relegation to either Hampshire 1 or Surrey 1.

London 3 South West (2000–2009)

London 3 South West continued to be a tier 7 league with promotion up to London 2 South.  However, the introduction of London 4 South West ahead of the 2000–01 season meant that clubs were relegated into this new division instead of into Hampshire 1 or Surrey 1.

London 2 South West (2009–present)

Nationwide league restructuring by the RFU ahead of the 2009–10 season saw London 3 South West renamed as London 2 South West.  It remained at level 7 with promotion to London 1 South (formerly London 2 South) and relegation to London 3 South West (formerly London 4 South West).

Promotion play-offs
Since the 2000–01 season there has been a play-off between the runners-up of London 2 South East and London 2 South West for the third and final promotion place to London 1 South. The team with the superior league record has home advantage in the tie.  At the end of the 2019–20 season the London 2 South West teams have been the most successful with ten wins to the London 2 South East teams nine, and the home team has won promotion on eleven occasions compared to the away teams eight.

Due to the COVID-19 pandemic, the season ended in March with four game rounds remaining. On 4 April 2020 the RFU announced that a "best playing record formula" would be used to determine promotion and relegation and there would be no play-offs.  Consequently, Farnham RFC (84.33 adjusted points tally) were promoted to London 1 South in favour of London 2 South East runners up Old Colfeians (83.11 adjusted points tally).

Number of league titles

Guildford (3)
Alton (2)
Andover (2)
Chobham (2)
Cobham (2)
Gosport & Fareham (2)
KCS Old Boys (2)
Portsmouth (2)
Battersea Ironsides (1)
Camberley (1)
Chichester (1)
Dorking (1)
Effingham & Leatherhead (1)
Guernsey (1)
Jersey (1)
London Cornish (1)
London Irish Amateur (1)
Old Blues (1)
Old Wimbledonians (1)
Purley (1)
Richmond (1)
Tottonians (1)
Wimbledon (1)
Winchester (1)

Notes

See also
 London & SE Division RFU
 Hampshire RFU
 Surrey RFU
 English rugby union system
 Rugby union in England

References

External links
 London 2 South West results at the Rugby Football Union

7
3
Rugby union in Surrey